Umm az-Zinat (Umm ez Zînât) was a Palestinian Arab village in the Haifa Subdistrict. It was depopulated during the 1948 War on May 15, 1948, by Golani Brigade's Fourth Battalion. It was located 20.5 km southeast of Haifa.

History
Ceramics from the Byzantine era have been found here.
Several rock cut tombs were found south and south west of the village. They have been dated to the Christian era.

Ottoman era
In 1859, the English Consul Rogers  stated that the population was 350 souls, with 25 feddans of cultivation.

In 1870,  Victor Guérin found the village to have four hundred and fifty inhabitants. Some gardens  were surrounded by a cactus. The medhafeh, or guest house,  also served as a mosque.

In 1882,  the PEF's Survey of Western Palestine (SWP) described the village as: "A good-sized village on a saddle, built principally of stone, with a well on the south. This seems to be an ancient site, having many well-cut rock-tombs."

A population list from about 1887 showed that Umm ez-Zeinat had about 750 inhabitants; all Muslims.

Umm al-Zinat had an elementary school for boys which was founded by the Ottomans in 1888.

British Mandate era
In the 1922 census of Palestine Umm al-Zainat had a population of 787; 782 Muslims and 5 Christians, where the Christians were all Melkite. This had increased in the  1931 census  to 1,020 Muslims and 9 Christians, in a total of  209  houses.

In the  1945 statistics, the village had a population of 1,470; 1,450 Muslims and 20 Christians,   with a total of 22,156 dunams of land.   Of this, 1,742 dunums of land were for  plantations and irrigable land, 9,879 for cereals,  while 69 dunams were classified as built-up land.

1948, aftermath
Umm az-Zinat became depopulated in May 1948. In early May, it was reported that the women and children of Umm az-Zinat had been evacuated.

One of the villagers said that "One day before the fall of Umm al-Zaynat, three men from the settlement of Ein HaEmek entered our village, warning us that the Haganah forces were preparing to enter our village, where their aim was to intimidate us to flee, and leave the village. Some of them feared and fled, and some of them remained and waited for their fate."

The Golani Brigade took the village on 15 May, 1948, and expelled the remaining villagers. In August 1948  Israeli troops returned, with orders to kill any males and expel any females they found in the village. At least 2 Palestinian men were killed, and a number of females were expelled.

In 1992 the village site was described: "The houses have been reduced to rubble, piles of which are scattered over the site. The site itself is overgrown with thorns, bushes, cactuses, and pomegranate and fig trees. There is also a small forest on part of the site. The village's cemetery is still visible. Part of the surrounding land is used by Israeli farmers as cattle pasture and is planted with fruit and olive trees."

References

Bibliography

 
  

  

Mülinen, Egbert Friedrich von  1908,    Beiträge zur Kenntnis des Karmels "Separateabdruck aus der Zeitschrift des Deutschen Palëstina-Vereins Band XXX (1907) Seite 117-207 und Band XXXI (1908) Seite 1-258."  Umm ez-Zeinat: p.353 ff.

External links
Welcome To Umm al-Zinat
Umm al-Zinat,  Zochrot
Survey of Western Palestine, Map 8:  IAA, Wikimedia commons 
Umm al-Zinat from the Khalil Sakakini Cultural Center
Um Al-Zinat,  from Dr. Moslih Kanaaneh
Umm Zinat, from Zochrot
Sixth Procession of Return by ADRID in Umm a-Zinat, 2003
Ninth Procession of Return to Um a-Zinat, 2006

Arab villages depopulated during the 1948 Arab–Israeli War
District of Haifa